Armfelt is both Swedish noble family and a Finnish noble family. Members of this family include Count Gustaf Mauritz Armfelt (1757–1814), a general, courtier and diplomat, and his granddaughter, Alexandra Zheleznova-Armfelt (1870–1933), a composer and collector of Russian folk music.

See also
The National Biography of Finland
Swedish-speaking Finns

Swedish noble families
Finnish noble families